The flamingo tongue snail (Cyphoma gibbosum) is a species of small but brightly colored sea snail, a marine gastropod mollusk in the family Ovulidae, the cowry allies.

Distribution
This is the most common of several species in the genus Cyphoma, which lives in the tropical waters of the western Atlantic Ocean from North Carolina to northern coast of Brazil, including off Bermuda, in the Caribbean Sea and the Gulf of Mexico, and off the Lesser Antilles .

Three species of Cyphoma, known as Cyphoma gibbosum, Cyphoma signatum and Cyphoma mcgintyi have been found to be genetically similar even though their phenotypes suggest otherwise. The species of Cyphoma signatum and Cyphoma mcgintyi can be distinguished from their different patterns; whether having a fingertip pattern or brown dots. However, if these two species were being distinguished based on their morphological features, it would be difficult to differentiate them. The genotype of these species is known to be very similar even though their phenotypes are different, and thus these species are hypothesized to have physical characteristics that precede their genetic makeup.

Description
Alive, the snail appears bright orange-yellow in color with black markings. However, these colors are not in the shell, but are only due to live mantle tissue which usually covers the shell. The mantle flaps can be retracted, exposing the shell, but this usually happens only when the animal is attacked.

The shape is usually elongated and the dorsum shows a thick transversal ridge. The dorsum surface is smooth and shiny and may be white or orange, with no markings at all except a longitudinal white or cream band. The base and the interior of a C. gibbosum shell is white or pinkish, with a wide aperture.

Ecology

The minimum recorded depth is at the surface, and the maximum recorded depth is 29 m.

The flamingo tongue snail feeds by browsing on the living tissues of the soft corals on which it lives. Common prey include Briareum spp., Gorgonia spp., Plexaura spp., and Plexaurella spp. Adult females of  C. gibbosum attach eggs to coral which they have recently fed upon. After roughly 10 days, the larvae hatch. They are planktonic and eventually settle onto other gorgonian corals. Juveniles tend to remain on the underside of coral branches, while adults are far more visible and mobile. An adult scrapes the polyps off the coral with its radula, leaving an easily visible feeding scar on the coral. However, the corals can regrow the polyps, so predation by C. gibbosum is generally not lethal.

Survival status
This species used to be common, but it has become rather uncommon in heavily visited areas because of overcollecting by snorkelers and scuba divers, who make the mistake of thinking that the bright colors are in the shell of the animal.

References 

 Flamingo tongue snail
 Coral reefs

Further reading 
 Burkepile D. E. & Hay M. E. (2007). Predator release of the gastropod Cyphoma gibbosum increases predation on gorgonian corals. Oecologia 154(1): 167–173. 
 Lorenz F. & Fehse D. (2009) The living Ovulidae. A manual of the families of allied cowries: Ovulidae, Pediculariidae and Eocypraeidae. Hackenheim: Conchbooks.
 Whalen K. E., Lane A. L., Kubanek J., Hahn M. E. (2010). Biochemical Warfare on the Reef: The Role of Glutathione Transferases in Consumer Tolerance of Dietary Prostaglandins. PLOS One 5(1): e8537.

External links

 
  Cate, C. N. 1973. A systematic revision of the recent Cypraeid family Ovulidae. Veliger 15 (supplement): 1-117
  Reijnen B.T. and van der Meij S.E.T. (2017). Coat of many colours? DNA reveals polymorphism of mantle patterns and colouration in Caribbean Cyphoma Röding, 1798 (Gastropoda, Ovulidae). PeerJ. 5: e3018
 

Ovulidae
Gastropods described in 1758
Taxa named by Carl Linnaeus